Coast Guard Station Chicago (Formerly Station Calumet River) is a United States Coast Guard station located on Lake Michigan in Chicago, Illinois. Station Chicago is both the largest and busiest station in the Ninth Coast Guard District. The station partakes in many missions including Search and Rescue, Law enforcement and Marine safety. The station also conducts about ten Presidential Security Zones.

References

External links
Station Homepage
Station Overview

Military installations in Illinois
United States Coast Guard stations
Buildings and structures in Chicago